The 1926 Tulane Green Wave football team represented Tulane University as a member of the Southern Conference (SoCon) during the 1926 college football season. Spirits were high to begin the season as Milton Levy was the only member of the 1925 line to leave, but the losses in the backfield of Lester Lautenschlaeger, Peggy Flournoy, and Fred Lamprecht proved to be costly. Captain Harry P. Gamble was All-Southern.

Schedule

References

Tulane
Tulane Green Wave football seasons
Tulane Green Wave football